Association Sportive de La Possession is a football club from La Possession, Réunion Island.

History 
The club was the fusion of AJS Possession and US Possession. The club won its first Super Division 2 title in 2010.

Titles 

Champion de Division 2R
 2010, 2014

Notes 

Possession
Association football clubs established in 1955
1955 establishments in Réunion